Mindcrest Inc. is a legal services provider headquartered in Chicago, Illinois, United States, with operations in India. Mindcrest specializes in litigation support, contracts, compliance, legal research, analytics, and real estate.

Mindcrest was the first company to offer outsourced legal services from India.

History 
Mindcrest was founded by Ganesh Natarajan, George Hefferan, Teju Deshpande and Rohan Dalal. Natarajan was a partner at international law firm McGuireWoods LLP who frequently traveled to India, and, in 2001, he asked his colleague at the firm, Hefferan, to launch Mindcrest, and the first third party outsourcing legal services company from India ensued. They asked Dalal, an entrepreneur who was experienced in operations in India and in outsourced services, and Deshpande, an IT and process expert, to bring their expertise to the new venture.

In 2006, Mindcrest received $4 million in funding from Talon Asset Management. Mindcrest opened its Pune facility in 2007 and moved to an expanded Mumbai facility in 2009.

Also, in 2009, Mindcrest launched its real estate group. Mindcrest now has offices in the following locations:
 Chicago, Illinois
 Pune, India
 New York, New York

DWF, a UK law firm, acquired Mindcrest in January 2020. With this integration, Mindcrest becomes the Managed Services arm of DWF.

The new entity will be branded as DWF Mindcrest. The management and client teams will continue with DWF Mindcrest.

Corporate affairs

Employee turnover 
Mindcrest's attrition rates are in the single digits. The company has a recruiting process to ensure it hires employees that fit the environment. It retains its employees by offering a performance-driven, non-hierarchical, learning culture.

Workforce 
Mindcrest has more than 60% women in its workforce of more than 600 people. Women have been the majority at Mindcrest since its inception.

Key people 
Members of Mindcrest's board of directors:
 William E. Wolf – COO, Talon Asset Management
 Manish Kothari – President and co-founder of AlphaSmart, Inc.
 Walter Freedman – previously COO of Wheels, Inc. and previously CEO of Yoplait USA
 Ganesh Natarajan – President and CEO, Mindcrest Inc.
 George Hefferan – Vice President, Sales and General Counsel, Mindcrest Inc.

Alliances 
Mindcrest was selected by the Association of Corporate Counsel (ACC) as the legal process outsourcing company in its ACC Alliance program.

See also 
 Business process outsourcing in India
 Cyber security standards
 ISO/IEC 27001
 Offshoring
 Outsourcing
 International Organization for Standardization
 List of ISO standards

References 

Outsourcing companies